The , or , is an interchange located in Okazu, Obama, Fukui Prefecture, Japan. It is the #10 interchange on and the terminus of the Maizuru-Wakasa Expressway, operated by the West Nippon Expressway Company (NEXCO). There are plans to extend the expressway beyond the Obama Nishi Interchange.

History
9 March 2003: The Obama Nishi Interchange opens at the same time as the Maizuru-Wakasa Expressway

Environs
JR West Kato Station (Obama Line)
Kato Post Office
Ministop Kato Store
Kinki Hiking Trail
Okazu Saltworks Ruins
Koikawa Beach

Highway access
National Route 27

References

External links
 West Nippon Expressway Company

Roads in Fukui Prefecture
Road interchanges in Japan
Obama, Fukui
2003 establishments in Japan